Markov tree may refer to:

 A tree whose vertices correspond to Markov numbers
 A Markov chain